Yishi Jin is a Chinese-American neurobiologist who is a professor at the Howard Hughes Medical Institute. She is interested in neural development and regeneration in nematode Caenorhabditis elegans. Jin is a Fellow of the American Association for the Advancement of Science, American Academy of Arts and Sciences and American Society for Cell Biology.

Early life and education 
Jin studied cell biology at the Peking University. She moved to the United States for graduate studies, where she worked at University of California, Berkeley. After earning her doctorate, Jin joined Massachusetts Institute of Technology as a postdoctoral fellow.

Research and career 
In 1996 Jin was appointed to the faculty at University of California, Santa Cruz, and by 2003 she had been promoted to Professor. In 2007 Jin joined the University of California, San Diego as a Professor of Neurobiology. Jin has studied the communication of neurons, formation of synapses, role of neural circuitry in controlling movement and regeneration of axons. Neural communication is mediated by axons that transmit electrical and chemical signals, which are received by receptor proteins. She showed that the protein DLK1 helps these axons to find their way, through a series of specific chemical signals. At the receiver end, Jin has shown that the quality of neurons is evaluated by the EBAX-1 and hsp90, which serve to identify defects and fix any flaws.

Jin has investigated the nerve fibres involved with neuroregeneration. During her investigations, she identified a new genetic pathway – the piwi-interacting RNA (piRNA) – the is involved with the rehabilitation of neuron damage. Jin believes that piRNA may be an effective therapeutic pathway, offering hope for the regeneration of axons. She spent 2016 as a neurobiology resident at Aix-Marseille University, where she studied traumatic brain injury and the regulators that initiate axon regrowth.

In 2018 Jin was named the inaugural Junior Seau Endowed Faculty Chair in Traumatic Brain Injury. The position was established in honour of Junior Seau, a member of the NFL Hall of Fame, who suffered from chronic traumatic encephalopathy. Jin was selected as the chair holder because of her research into the effective treatment and prevention of traumatic brain injury. As an advocate for improving young people's access to science, Jin committed to using the position to advocate for K–12 education and better safety in sports.

Awards and honours 
 1997 Alfred P. Sloan Research Fellow
 2000 Presidential Early Career Award for Scientists and Engineers
 2003 Geisel Library Honored Faculty and Honored Books
 2010 Elected Fellow of the American Association for the Advancement of Science
 2017 National Institute of Neurological Disorders and Stroke Javits Neuroscience Investigator Award
 2019 Elected Fellow of the American Academy of Arts and Sciences
 2020 Elected Fellow of the American Society for Cell Biology

Selected publications

References 

Living people
Year of birth missing (living people)
American women neuroscientists
Fellows of the American Association for the Advancement of Science
Peking University alumni
University of California, Berkeley alumni
Fellows of the American Academy of Arts and Sciences
Fellows of the American Society for Cell Biology
21st-century American women scientists
21st-century American biologists
American women biologists
American neuroscientists
21st-century Chinese scientists
Recipients of the Presidential Early Career Award for Scientists and Engineers